Triple J Magazine is an Australian music magazine associated with the Australian Broadcasting Corporation's youth radio station Triple J. It is independently owned and published for ABC Magazines by News Custom Publishing.

History and profile
The magazine was started as a quarterly publication in 2005. It was originally called J Mag, then jmag, and was rebranded in August 2010 to incorporate the Triple J logo and full name in its masthead after research indicated that greater association with the station's branding would appeal to non-reader listeners. From 2007 the magazine was published monthly and then, bi-monthly. The magazine was published on a bi-monthly basis until June/July 2013 issue when it began to be published annually. At the same time the offices of the magazine was transferred from Melbourne to Sydney.

It is the only place where Triple J programs for the forthcoming month are listed, apart from the station's own website. It features presenters, the Triple J Hottest 100, Unearthed profiles, as well as reviews for music, DVDs and TV such as Rage and other ABC TV programs including digital channel ABC3.

References

External links

Official website

Annual magazines published in Australia
Monthly magazines published in Australia
Music magazines published in Australia
Quarterly magazines published in Australia
Bi-monthly magazines published in Australia
Listings magazines
Magazines established in 2005
Magazines published in Melbourne
Magazines published in Sydney